Talbot Rice may refer to:

Places
 Talbot Rice Gallery, art gallery of the University of Edinburgh

People
 Alexander Talbot-Rice (born 1969), British portrait artist
 David Talbot Rice (1903–1972), English art historian
 Tamara Talbot Rice (1904–1993), Russian-English art historian